Walter Jennings may refer to:

 Walter Jennings (chemist) (1922–2012), American academic, chemist and entrepreneur
 Walter Jennings (footballer) (1897–1970), English footballer
 Walter Jennings (industrialist) (1858–1933), American industrialist and art collector
 Walter Jennings (politician) (1864–1942), Newfoundland politician and fisherman
 Dr. Walter Jennings, a fictional character in the movie Sky Captain and the World of Tomorrow

See also
 Wally Jennings (1909–1993), English footballer